The Battlefords is a provincial electoral district for the Legislative Assembly of Saskatchewan, Canada. It includes the city of North Battleford and the adjoining town of Battleford. Collectively these communities are commonly known as "The Battlefords".

The district was first established in 1917 from the urban portions of the constituencies of Battleford and North Battleford.  The district was contested in every election until 1995, when it was broken up into the re-created district of North Battleford and a new district, Battleford-Cut Knife. It was most recently contested in the 2020 election, when Saskatchewan Party candidate Jeremy Cockrill was elected.

North Battleford and Battleford-Cut Knife were abolished in 2003 and The Battlefords re-established as an electoral district.

Members of the Legislative Assembly

Electoral results

 

 

|-

 
|NDP
|Len Taylor
|align="right"|2,475
|align="right"|35.83%
|align="right"|-7.99%

|Liberal
|Ryan Bater
|align="right"|812
|align="right"|11.76%
|align="right"|-1.60%

|- bgcolor="white"
!align="left" colspan=3|Total
!align="right"|6,907
!align="right"|100.00%
!align="right"|

|-
 
| style="width: 130px" |NDP
|Len Taylor
|align="right"|3,056
|align="right"|42.53%
|align="right"|*
 
|Liberal
|Jack Hillson
|align="right"|2,134
|align="right"|29.70%
|align="right"|*

|- bgcolor="white"
!align="left" colspan=3|Total
!align="right"|7,185
!align="right"|100.00%
!align="right"|

References

External links 
Website of the Legislative Assembly of Saskatchewan
Saskatchewan Archives Board – Saskatchewan Election Results By Electoral Division

North Battleford
Saskatchewan provincial electoral districts